Afrikanda may refer to:
Afrikanda (rural locality), a rural locality in Murmansk Oblast, Russia
Afrikanda railway station, a railway station there
Afrikanda air base, a military air base in Murmansk Oblast, Russia